Bhose is a village in the Karmala taluka of Solapur district in Maharashtra state, India.

Demographics
Covering  and comprising 197 households at the time of the 2011 census of India, Bhose had a population of 936. There were 485 males and 451 females, with 127 people being aged six or younger.

References

Villages in Karmala taluka